Domini Margaret Lawrence (born 8 May 1925) was a British equestrian. She competed at the 1968 Summer Olympics and the 1972 Summer Olympics.

References

External links
 

1925 births
Living people
British female equestrians
British dressage riders
Olympic equestrians of Great Britain
Equestrians at the 1968 Summer Olympics
Equestrians at the 1972 Summer Olympics
Sportspeople from London